The A16 is a relatively short Belgian motorway connecting Mons and Tournai. But it is an important European-Motorway between Belgium, Germany, France and the United Kingdom.

References

Motorways in Belgium